The Asian Beach Games, also known as ABG, is a multi-sport event held every four years among athletes from all over Asia. The Games have been organized by the Olympic Council of Asia (OCA). The Games are described as the second or third largest Asian multi-sport event, after the Asian Games. Its popularity is increasing due to the low cost of temporary venues, with beaches and oceans already available, while spectators and tourists are also already available in sand and sea tourist areas.

In its history, six countries have hosted the Asian Beach Games. Forty-five nations have participated in the Games.

The most recent Games were held in Danang, Vietnam from 24 September to 3 October 2016, while the next games will be held in 2023 in Sanya, China; the 2023 Games will be the first to break away from the 2-year cycle.

Participating nations

All 45 countries whose National Olympic Committee is recognized by the Olympic Council of Asia

List of Asian Beach Games

Sports

Medal count

See also

 Events of the OCA (Continental)
 Asian Games
 Asian Winter Games
 Asian Youth Games
 Asian Beach Games
 Asian Indoor and Martial Arts Games

 Events of the OCA (Regional)
 East Asian Games
 Central Asian Games
 South Asian Games
 West Asian Games
 Southeast Asian Games
 Pacific Games

 Events of the APC
 Asian Para Games
 Asian Youth Para Games

References

 
Asian international sports competitions
Multi-sport events in Asia
Biennial sporting events
Beach sports competitions
Recurring sporting events established in 2008
Olympic Council of Asia